Sidi Bou Ali is a town and commune in the Sousse Governorate, Tunisia. As of 2004 it had a population of 9,011.

Ancient history 

During the Roman occupation of present-day Tunisia, Sidi Bou Ali was known as Ulissipira. The only remnant of the town is an amphitheater, located to the west of the city's present-day location.

See also 
List of cities in Tunisia

References

External links
Information regarding Roman ruins

Populated places in Tunisia
Communes of Tunisia
Tunisia geography articles needing translation from French Wikipedia